Hamid Erfani  is an Iranian football goalkeeper who currently plays for Zob Ahan in the Iran Premier League.

References

1988 births
Living people
Giti Pasand players
Association football forwards
Iranian footballers